Rostamabad (also Romanized as Rostamābād and Rūstamābād; also known as Rostamābād-e Ālākīk) is a village in Sagezabad Rural District, in the Central District of Buin Zahra County, Qazvin Province, Iran. At the 2006 census, its population was 564, in 169 families.

References 

Populated places in Buin Zahra County